Jorge Urrutia Galicia is a Mexican mathematician and computer scientist in the Institute of Mathematics of the National Autonomous University of Mexico (UNAM). His research primarily concerns discrete and computational geometry.

Education and career
Urrutia earned his Ph.D. from the University of Waterloo in 1980, under the supervision of Ronald C. Read.
He worked for many years at the University of Ottawa before moving to UNAM in 1999.
With Jörg-Rüdiger Sack in 1991, he was founding co-editor-in-chief of the academic journal Computational Geometry: Theory and Applications.

Recognition
Urrutia is a member of the Mexican Academy of Sciences. The Mexican Conference on Discrete Mathematics and Computational Geometry, held in 2013 in Oaxaca, was dedicated to Urrutia in honor of his 60th birthday.

Selected publications

; preliminary version in Proceedings of the Twelfth Annual Symposium on Computational Geometry (SoCG 1996), 

; preliminary version in Proceedings of the 3rd International Workshop on Discrete Algorithms and Methods for Mobile Computing and Communications (DIAL-M 1999), 
; preliminary version in Proceedings of the 8th International Conference on Algorithms and Complexity (CIAC 2013),

References

External links

Homepage
Google scholar profile

Year of birth missing (living people)
Living people
Mexican computer scientists
20th-century Mexican  mathematicians
21st-century Mexican mathematicians
Researchers in geometric algorithms
University of Waterloo alumni
Academic staff of the University of Ottawa
Academic staff of the National Autonomous University of Mexico
Members of the Mexican Academy of Sciences